The Russian five-ruble banknote was introduced in 1998 (replacing the old 5000 ruble note) and then discontinued in 2001 because of inflation. Five-ruble notes are very hard to find in general circulation. The most prominent color of the note is light-green in the background.

Design
The design is dedicated to the city of Veliky Novgorod. On the obverse is the Millennium of Russia with Saint Sophia Cathedral in Novgorod in the background. On the reverse is the fortress wall of the Novgorod Kremlin. The Volkhov River is also seen in the background above the wall.

Security features
The five-ruble note has a number of security features. The note has two watermarks, the one on the left is the denomination of the bill, whilst the one on the right is Saint Sophia Cathedral in Novgorod. Both can be seen when held up to the light. A security thread runs through the banknote – when held up to the light "ЦБР 5" can be seen. The vertical banner to the left of the Millennium of Russia, is printed on both sides of the note, when held up to the light the band should be complete. Blue, red, and yellow threads are randomly distributed across the banknote. When viewed at an angle, the letters PP appear on the bottom banner. Next to the denomination in the lower left hand corner are two raised dots known as intaglio printing for the visually impaired. Under UV Light the colored threads glow.

References

External links
 Russian Federation 5 Rubles 1997

Currencies of Russia
Five-base-unit banknotes